Dolomite is an unincorporated community in Inyo County, California.

Originally, in 1883, a siding on the Carson and Colorado Railroad, the town developed in 1885, when the Inyo Marble Company opened a quarry at the site.

A number of Western films have been shot in Dolomite, including Sinister Journey (1948), From Hell to Texas (1958), Hell Bent for Leather (1960), An Eye For An Eye (1966), Nevada Smith (1966) and Waterhole No. 3 (1967).

References

Unincorporated communities in California
Unincorporated communities in Inyo County, California
Populated places in the Mojave Desert